Bassler is a surname, and may refer to:

 Bonnie Bassler (born 1962), an American molecular biologist
 Friedrich Bassler (1909–1992), a German hydraulic engineer
 Johnny Bassler (1895–1979), an American baseball catcher
 Ray S. Bassler (1878–1961), an American paleontologist
 Robert Bassler (1903–1975),an  American movie producer
 William G. Bassler (born 1938), an American federal judge

Bässler may refer to:
 Hans Bässler (born 1934), a Swiss fencer
 Manfred Bässler (Bässler, born 1935), a botanist